Anema may refer to:

Anema (lichen), genus of lichen within the family Lichinaceae
Anima: Age of the Robots, formerly called Anema, a comic series

See also

Anema e core (disambiguation)
 Anima (disambiguation)
Anemas, a Byzantine aristocratic family
Anemia (disambiguation)
Anemia or anaemia, a blood disorder